Headcount Index by Parish in Antigua and Barbuda in the 2011 census.

The two parishes/capital cities with higher than the average poverty levels of 18.36% were St. John's City and St. Philip. St. John's City and St. John's Rural follow.

References

Parishes
Antigua and Barbuda